Estádio Mártires da Canhala is a football stadium in Caála, Huambo, Angola. It is owned by C.R. Caála.

The stadium underwent a major rehabilitation in 2012. and has an 11,000-seat capacity.

References

Football venues in Angola